The Centennial and Memorial Association of Valley Forge was incorporated in Montgomery County, Pennsylvania in 1878, with the objective of saving, acquiring, restoring, and preserving General Washington's Valley Forge Headquarters and surrounding acreage as parcels of it became available.

History 
Led by founding Regent Anna Morris Holstein and her team, the initial awareness and fundraising campaigns began with a large celebration on June 19, 1878, to commemorate the 100th anniversary of departure of the Army of the Revolution from their winter quarters. Stock certificates were sold and other events planned to raise funds. Initial funds were used to acquire General Washington's headquarters from owner Hannah Ogden in 1878.

More acreage was subsequently purchased, original artifacts acquired, and necessary repairs and renovations done to restore the home to the time of the 1777–1778 encampment. Due to Anna's relationship with the Mount Vernon Ladies' Association, they were able to bring a tree from General Washington's home back to his Valley Forge Headquarters and plant it in his memory. These and other sustained efforts led to the State of Pennsylvania making Valley Forge the first State Park in Pennsylvania in 1893; tens of millions have enjoyed it since.

On July 4, 1976, the United States Bicentennial, President Gerald Ford visited Valley Forge Park, addressed the crowd and the nation on live TV, and signed H.R. 5621, making Valley Forge an historical site and national park.

In addition to Mrs. Holstein, who served the association from its inception until her death in 1900, several other prominent people from Upper Merion, Norristown and Montgomery County, and across Pennsylvania, served as the association's executives and board members during its early years, including Helen C. Hooven (Vice Regent), Mrs. Rebecca McInnes, Freeland G. Hobson Esq. (Treasurer), Henry J Stager (Vice Regent), Colonel Theodore W. Bean, The Honorable Richard Henry Koch, Mr Richard T. Hallowell, and Frank L. Murphy Esq.

References

Military history of the United States
National Historic Landmarks in Pennsylvania
Houses on the National Register of Historic Places in Pennsylvania
Valley Forge National Historical Park
National Register of Historic Places in Montgomery County, Pennsylvania
Upper Merion Township, Montgomery County, Pennsylvania